The Alamance-Burlington School System is a school district covering Alamance County and the city of Burlington in the U.S. state of North Carolina. It was created in July 1996 by merging the respective systems of the county and city.

For the school year of 2020-2021 it had 23,148 students (NC's 14th largest system) in 36 schools.

Schools

High Schools

 Alamance-Burlington Early/Middle College
 Career and Technical Education Center
 Hugh M Cummings High School
 Eastern Alamance High School
 Graham High School
 Ray Street Academy
 Southern Alamance High School
 Western Alamance High School
 Walter M. Williams High School

Middle Schools

 Broadview Middle School
 Graham Middle School
 Hawfields Middle School
 Turrentine Middle School
 Western Alamance Middle School
 Woodlawn Middle School

Elementary Schools

 Alexander Wilson Elementary School
 Altamahaw-Ossipee Elementary School
 Andrews Elementary School
 Eastlawn Elementary School
 Elon Elementary School
 Garrett Elementary School
 Grove Park Elementary School
 Haw River Elementary School
 Highland Elementary School
 Hillcrest Elementary School
 Holt Elementary School
 Jordan Elementary School
 Newlin Elementary School
 North Graham Elementary School
 Pleasant Grove Elementary School
 Smith Elementary School
 Southern Middle School
 South Graham Elementary School
 South Mebane Elementary School
 Sylvan Elementary School
 Yoder Elementary School
 ABSS Virtual School

References

External links

Education in Alamance County, North Carolina
School districts in North Carolina
School districts established in 1996